Clarke Glacier  is a 5 mile long glacier, which drains east to the coast of Victoria Land, immediately north of Lewandowski Point.  The seaward extremity of this glacier merges with the flow of Davis Glacier and other glaciers from the south and contributes to the floating tongue of ice between Cape Reynolds and Lamplugh Island.

The glacier was discovered and named by the British Imperial Antarctic Expedition (BrAE) (1907-1909) under Ernest Shackleton.

See also
 List of glaciers in the Antarctic
 Geography of Antarctica
 Geology of Antarctica
 Glaciology

References 
This article incorporates text in the public domain from the United States Department of the Interior.

External links 

Glaciers of Victoria Land